Euphranta is a genus of fruit flies in the family Tephritidae. There are at least 90 described species in Euphranta.

Species

References

Further reading

External links

 

Trypetinae
Tephritidae genera